Shintaro Mochizuki was the defending champion having won the previous edition in 2019. He participated in the men's singles qualifying, but lost to Tallon Griekspoor in the second round.

Samir Banerjee won the title, defeating Victor Lilov in the final, 7–5, 6–3.

Seeds

Draw

Finals

Top half

Section 1

Section 2

Bottom half

Section 3

Section 4

Qualifying

Seeds

Qualifiers

Draw

First qualifier

Second qualifier

Third qualifier

Fourth qualifier

Fifth qualifier

Sixth qualifier

Seventh qualifier

Eighth qualifier

References

External links

 Draw

Boys' Singles
Wimbledon Championship by year – Boys' singles